Abdul Hannan (born 4 September 2004) is an Indian professional footballer who plays as a defender for Chennaiyin in the Indian Super League.

Career
Abdul Hannan made his first professional appearance for Indian Arrows on 10 January 2021 against Churchill Brothers.

Career statistics

Club

References

2004 births
Living people
Footballers from Punjab, India
Indian footballers
Indian Arrows players
I-League players
Association football defenders